Alexander Riazantsev (Russian: Александр Рязанцев; born 12 September 1985) is a Russian chess grandmaster. In 2016, he won the Russian Chess Championship and the European Rapid Chess Championship. He is one of the coaches of the Russian women's national chess team.

Career
Riazantsev won the World Youth Chess Championship in the U12 section in 1997, and the European Youth Chess Championship in the U14 division in 1998. In 2005, he won the Stork Young Masters tournament in Hengelo on tiebreak from Andrey Zhigalko, Vladimir Belov and David Baramidze. The following year, he came first in the Moscow championship. In 2010, Riazantsev tied for 1st–7th places with Vitali Golod, Nadezhda Kosintseva, Leonid Kritz, Sébastien Feller, Christian Bauer, Sébastien Mazé in the Master Open at the 43rd Biel Chess Festival, winning the event on tie-break score.

He competed in the FIDE World Cup in 2011 and 2013.

In September 2011, Riazantsev was appointed Russian national team coach.

References

External links

Alexander Riazantsev chess games at 365Chess.com
Interview with Alexander Riazantsev at chesscafe.com 

1985 births
Living people
Chess grandmasters
Russian chess players
World Youth Chess Champions
Chess coaches
National team coaches
Sportspeople from Moscow